Yakshinis or yakshis (यक्षिणी  or yakṣī;  or yakkhī) are a class of female nature spirits in Hindu, Buddhist, and Jain religious mythologies that are different from devas and asuras (classes of power-seeking beings), and gandharvas or apsaras (celestial nymphs). Yakshinis and their male counterparts, the yakshas, are one of the many paranormal beings associated with the centuries-old sacred groves of India. Yakshis are also found in the traditional legends of Northeastern Indian tribes, ancient legends of Kerala, and in the folktales of Kashmiri Muslims. Sikhism also mentions yakshas in its sacred texts.

The well behaved and benign ones are worshipped as tutelaries, they are the attendees of Kubera, the treasurer of the gods, and also the Hindu god of wealth who ruled Himalayan kingdom of Alaka. There are also malign and mischievous yakshinis with poltergeist-like behaviours, that can haunt and curse humans according to Indian folklore.

The ashoka tree is closely associated with yakshinis. The young girl at the foot of the tree is an ancient motif indicating fertility on the Indian subcontinent.  One of the recurring elements in Indian art, often found as gatekeepers in ancient Buddhist and Hindu temples, is a yakshini with her foot on the trunk and her hands holding the branch of a stylized flowering ashoka or, less frequently, other tree with flowers or fruits.

Yakshinis in Buddhism

The three sites of Bharhut, Sanchi, and Mathura, have yielded huge numbers of Yakshi figures, most commonly on the railing pillars of stupas. These show a clear development and progression that establishes certain characteristics of the Yakshi figure such as her nudity, smiling face and evident (often exaggerated) secondary sexual characteristics that lead to their association with fertility. The yakshi is usually shown with her hand touching a tree branch, in a sinuous tribhanga pose, thus some authors hold that the young girl at the foot of the tree is based on an ancient tree deity.

Yakshis were important in early Buddhist monuments as a decorative element and are found in many ancient Buddhist archaeological sites. They became Salabhanjikas (sal tree maidens) with the passing of the centuries, a standard decorative element of both Indian sculpture and Indian temple architecture.

The sal tree (Shorea robusta) is often confused with the ashoka tree (Saraca indica) in the ancient literature of the Indian Subcontinent. The position of the Salabhanjika is also related to the position of Queen Māyā of Sakya when she gave birth to Gautama Buddha under an asoka tree in a garden in Lumbini, while grasping its branch.

List of yakshini found in Buddhist literature 
Below is a nonexhaustive list of yakshinis found in Buddhist literature:

Hārītī
Ālikā
Vendā
Anopamā
Vimalaprabhā
Śrī
Śankhinī
Meghā
Timisikā
Prabhāvatī
Bhīmā
Haritā
Mahādevī
Nālī
Udaryā
Kuntī
Sulocanā
Śubhru
Susvarā
Sumatī
Vasumatī
Citrākṣī
Pūrnasniṣā
Guhykā
Suguhyakā
Mekhalā
Sumekhalā
Padmocchā
Abhayā
Jayā
Vijayā
Revatikā
Keśinī
Keśāntā
Anila
Manoharā
Manovatī
Kusumavatī
Kusumapuravāsinī
Pingalā
Vīramatī
Vīrā
Suvīrā
Sughorā
Ghorā
Ghorāvatī
Surāsundari
Surasā
Guhyottamārī
Vaṭavāsinī
Aśokā
Andhārasunarī
Ālokasunarī
Prabhāvatī
Atiśayavatī
Rūpavatī
Surūpā
Asitā
Saumyā
Kāṇā
Menā
Nandinī
Upanandinī
Lokāntarā
Kuvaṇṇā (Pali) 
Cetiyā (Pali)
Piyaṅkaramātā (Pali)
Punabbasumātā (Pali)
Bhesakalā (Pali)

Yakshinis in Hinduism
In the Uddamareshvara Tantra, thirty-six yakshinis are described, including their mantras and ritual prescriptions. A similar list of yakshas and yakshinis are given in the Tantraraja Tantra, where it says that these beings are givers of whatever is desired. They are the guardians of the treasure hidden in the earth.They can be Sattvik, Rajas, Tamas in nature.

36 Yakshinis

The sadhak can take yakshini as mother, sister or wife before commencing it. Proper mantra dikshaa from guru can speed up the mantra siddhi. They can be invoked with mantra "Om hreem shreem nityadravae mada (yakshini name) shreem hreem". The list of thirty six yakshinis given in the Uddamareshvara Tantra is as follows, along with some of the associated legends:

 Vichitra (The Lovely One)
 Vibhrama (Amorous One): She is a tamas yakshini and should be worshipped naked by lighting camphor, ghee, and her mantra should be recited 20,000 times. Her mantra should be written with dust from Cremation Ground. After that 20,000 times havan need to be performed with cow ghee.
 Hamsi (The one with Swan)
 Bhishani (The Terrifying)
 Janaranjika (Pleasuring Men)
 Vishala (Large Eyed)
 Madana (Lustful)
 Ghanta (Bell)
 Kalakarni (Ears Adorned with Kalas): Recite her mantra 10000 times with blade of grass. She gives a shakti.
 Mahabhaya (Greatly Fearful)
 Mahendri (Greatly Powerful): Gives the person the ability to fly. One obtains Patala Siddhi.
 Shankhini (Conch Girl ): Fulfilment of any desire.
 Chandri (Moon Girl): 
 Shmashana (Cremation Ground Girl ): She is a Tamas yakshini.
 Vatayakshini: She resides in the banyan tree.
 Mekhala (Love Girdle): She gives magical unguent which when smeared subjugated women. The sadhak has to go to madhuka tree in blossom on 14th day of lunar cycle and must chant her mantra. "Om Drim hum madanamekalayai madanavidhambanayai namah svaha".
 Vikala
 Lakshmi (Wealth)
 Malini (Flower Girl )
 Shatapatrika (100 Flowers )
 Sulochana (Lovely Eyed)
 Shobha
 Kapalini (Skull Girl)
 Varayakshini: She bestows boons to sadhak.
 Nati (Actress):
 Kameshvari: She gives gems,clothes and secrets of alchemy to the sadhak.
 Dhana yakshini: She is used to provide knowledge on past,present.She is a sattva yakshini.She also provide riches to the sadhak.The sadhak should climb and sit on banyan tree and chant 10000 times "Om Aim hreem shreem dhana kuru kuru swaha" during daytime.
 Karnapisachi: She is a tamas yakshini.She is used by aghori to know about past and present life of person by whispering in ear of person who has attained siddhi.It is mentioned that sadhak should leave this Siddhi else the karnapisachi takes soul of sadhak for serving it for 1000 years.Her mantra is "Om arvinde swaha" which needs to be chanted 10000 times within 21 days.
 Manohara (Fascinating)
 Pramoda (Fragrant): For one month rise at midnight and pronounce the mantra for 1000 times. "Om hrim pramodyai swaha".
 Anuragini (Very Passionate)
 Nakhakeshi: She gives fruit on Siddhi.
 Bhamini: She gives an wonderful unguent which smeared alludes women and helps find treasure. Recite her mantra at the time of an of eclipse. "Om hrim yakshini bhamini ratipriye swaha".
 Padmini: She is mentioned in (35).
 Svarnavati: She gives Anjana Siddhi.
 Ratipriya (Fond of Love): She is a Satva yakshini.Her image should be drawn in yellow silk cloth with beautiful women Adorned with jewels and worshipped with ghee lamp,one unbroken nutmeg.She should be invoked with mantra "Om hrim ratipriya swaha" or "Om agacchh ratipriye swaha" each night(from 11.30 am to 3.30 am)till the yakshini manifests. During the time of sadhana,the sadhak should not eat Non veg, betel leaves. It is not suitable for married men.

Yakshinis in Jainism

In Jainism, there are twenty-five yakshis, including Panchanguli, Chakreshvari, Ambika, and Padmavati, who are frequently represented in Jain temples. Each is regarded as the guardian goddess of one of the present tirthankar Shri Simandhar Swami and twenty-four Jain tirthankara.  The names according to Tiloyapannatti (or Pratishthasarasangraha) and Abhidhanachintamani are:

 Panchanguli
Chakreshvari
 Rohini, Ajitbala
 Prajnapti, Duritari
 Vajrashrankhala, Kali
 Vajrankusha, Mahakali
 Manovega, Shyama
 Kali, Shanta
 Jwalamalini, Mahajwala
 Mahakali, Sutaraka
 Manavi, Ashoka
 Gauri, Manavi
 Gandhari, Chanda
 Vairoti, Vidita
 Anantamati, Ankusha
 Manasi, Kandarpa
 Mahamansi, Nirvani
 Jaya, Bala
 Taradevi, Dharini
 Vijaya, Dharanpriya
 Aparajita, Nardatta
 Bahurupini, Gandhari
 Ambika or Kushmandini
 Padmavati
 Siddhayika

Legendary Yakshis of South India

In the literature and folktales of Kerala, Yakshis are generally not considered benevolent. Many folk stories feature murdered women reborn as vengeful yakshis, some of which are listed below. Aside from those mentioned below, yakshis are also featured in Malayatoor Ramakrishnan's 1967 novel Yakshi, which describes their world as having a blue sun, carpets of crimson grass, streams of molten silver, and flowers made of sapphires, emeralds, garnets, and topaz. In the novel, young yakshis fly around on the backs of giant dragonflies. According to Ramakrishnan's novel, adult yakshis are required to enter the land of the living once a year to feed on the blood of human men.

Chempakavally Ammal and Neelapilla Ammal 
According to a legend from Thekkalai, next to Nagercoil in Tamil Nadu, a pair of beautiful sisters named Chempakavally and Neelapilla turned into vengeful yakshis after becoming victims of an honor killing by their father. Since their father killed them to keep them from the clutches of the lustful raja of the region, the sister yakshis tortured and killed everyone in the palace, and their father as well. The two yakshis haunted the place where they were killed until they were placated somewhat by many poojas and rituals the construction of a temple on the site. Idols of the sister yakshis are present inside. The older sister, Chempakavally, eventually transformed into a benevolent deity and traveled to Mount Kailash to worship Lord Shiva, while the younger sister, Neelapilla, remained ferocious. It is said that some of Neelapilla's devotees offer her the fingernail clippings or locks of hair from their enemies, beseeching her to destroy them.

Kalliyankattu Neeli
One of the most famous stories of legendary Yakshis of Kerala is that of Kalliyankattu Neeli, a powerful demoness who was fabled to have finally been stopped by the legendary priest Kadamattathu Kathanar. The Yakshi theme is the subject of popular Keralite tales, like the legend of the Yakshi of Trivandrum, as well as of certain movies in modern Malayalam cinema.

Kanjirottu Yakshi
Mangalathu Sreedevi or Chiruthevi, also known as Kanjirottu Yakshi is a yakshi from the folklore of Kerala. According to legend, she was born into a Padamangalam Nair tharavad by name Mangalathu at Kanjiracode in South Travancore. She was also known as Chiruthevi. She was a ravishingly beautiful courtesan who had an intimate relationship with Raman Thampi, son of King Rama Varma and rival of Anizhom Thirunal Marthanda Varma. Made arrogant by her beauty and the adoration heaped on her by men, she enjoyed toying with men's lives and driving them to financial ruin.

However, Chiruthevi was truly in love with Kunjuraman, her palanquin-bearer, who was already married and uninterested in her romantically. In frustration, Chiruthevi arranged to have Kunjuraman's wife killed. Kunjuraman finally agreed to sleep with Chiruthevi, but then murdered her to avenge his wife. 

Immediately after her death, Chiruthevi was reborn as a yakshi in the village of Kanjirottu, where she magically transformed into a beautiful woman mere moments after her birth. She terrorized men and drank their blood, and continued to harass Kunjuraman. Her frenzy only subsided after she made a deal with her brother Mangalathu Govindan, a close associate of Kunjuraman and a great upasaka of Lord Balarama. According to their agreement she would cohabit with Kunjuraman for a year on the condition that she would become a devotee of Narasimha after the year was up. The yakshi was installed at a temple which later came to be owned by Kanjiracottu Valiaveedu, though this temple no longer exists.

Sundara Lakshmi, an accomplished dancer and consort of HH Swathi Thirunal Rama Varma, was an ardent devotee of Kanjirottu Yakshi Amma.

The Kanjirottu yakshi is now said to reside in Vault B of Sri Padmanabhaswamy Temple in Thiruvananthapuram, Kerala, which supposedly also contains an enormous treasure. The enchanting and ferocious forms of this Yakshi are painted on the south-west part of Sri Padmanabha's shrine. The vault remains unopened due to ongoing legal issues and the legend of the Yakshi, whom some believe will wreak havoc on the world if her prayers to Lord Narasimha within Vault B are disturbed by opening the vault.

Beyond the Indian subcontinent and Hinduism

In China, Taiwan, and Japan yakshni are famous and well-known, such as Hariti, one of the Twenty-Four Protective Deities who are venerated as defenders of the Buddhist dharma inMahayana Buddhism. The Kishimojin (Hariti) temple in Zoushigaya, Tokyo is dedicated to her. 

In Thailand, yakshni are known and worshiped as deity guardians in Tai Folk religion and Thai folklore, showing the influence of Buddhism and Hinduism on Thai culture. Yakshini have spirit houses and shrines devoted to them as Tutelary deities in Thai folk religion. Examples include Nang Phisuea Samudra (ศาลนางผีเสื้อสมุทร), considered the deity guardian of Phisuea Samut Fort, Phra Samut Chedi District, Samut Prakan Province, Seang Chan Beach in Mueang Rayong district, and Rayong province; Nang Suphanapsron chomtevi (นางสุพรรณอัปสรจอมเทวี), considered the deity guardian of Wat Nang thakian (วัดนางตะเคียน) in Mueang Samut Songkhram district, and Samut Songkhram province; and Nang Panturat (ศาลนางพันธุรัตน์) from the Sang Thong, considered the deity guardian of Khao Nang Panthurat Forest Park, Khao Yai Sup district, Cha-am district, and Phetchaburi province.

In Myanmar, yakshni are known and worshiped as deity guardians in Myanmar folk religion and Burmese folklore, showing the influence of Buddhism and Hinduism on Burmese culture. Examples include Popa Medaw, the deity guardian of Popa mountain, and the yakshni deity guardian of the Shwedagon Pagoda.

See also

Apsara
Salabhanjika
Shitala
Nariphon
Nymph
Fairy
Houri
Yogini
List of tree deities

Succubus

References

External links

Concept of Yakshi (archived 21 July 2011)
Encyclopædia Britannica — "Yaksha"
RBI Monetary Museum — "Yaksha and Yakshini"
Ideals of Female Beauty in Ancient India
Huntingdon Archive

Buddhist legendary creatures
Non-human races in Hindu mythology
Indian folklore
Female buddhas and supernatural beings
Female legendary creatures
Mythological hematophages
Yakshas
Harvest goddesses
Jainism